Rapsittie Street Kids: Believe in Santa is a 2002 American musical animated Christmas special. One of two films produced by Colin Slater's Wolf Tracer Studios, the special features the voices of Walter Emanuel Jones, Mark Hamill, Jodi Benson, Paige O'Hara and Nancy Cartwright. Believe in Santa tells the story of how suburban boy Ricky Rodgers celebrates Christmas after the death of his mother.

Believe in Santa was broadcast throughout December in broadcast syndication in the top 100 markets, though its most prevalent distribution was through The WB 100+ Station Group, which broadcast The WB over cable and broadcast stations in smaller markets (it did not air on The WB itself as part of its primetime schedule). The special is notable for its production history and overwhelmingly negative reception. Almost every aspect of the special was panned, including its low-quality and ugly looking computer animation and amateur plot, although the voice acting received some minor praise. After a small number of broadcasts during the 2002 holiday season, the special was never officially released on home video and faded into obscurity. A copy of the special was secured from producer and director Colin Slater and uploaded onto the video sharing site Vimeo in 2015. It later garnered a cult following. Colin Slater died at the age of 70 in early 2019.

Synopsis
Archived from the Wisconsin State Journal (when WBUW in Madison, Wisconsin aired it): "The 'Rapsittie Street Kids' star in this animated musical, in which Ricky gives Nicole his most treasured possession, his teddy bear, as a holiday gift."

Plot
Ricky Rodgers is a poor preteen boy who lives on Rapsittie Street with his great-grandmother Fran. When his class' Christmas gift exchange is coming up, Ricky wishes to give his teddy bear gifted to him from his late mother to his classmate, Nicole, an affluent and self-centered girl who believes that anything she deems as "cheap" is not worth her time. When Ricky gives her the bear after school, she angrily rejects it and throws it in the trash, causing Ricky to run away upset.

After writing a letter to Santa and being teased by Nicole for doing so, Ricky heads to mail off the letters only to drop one of them, resulting in the wind blowing it to Nicole's house. Nicole reads and learns that alongside a video game console, Ricky asked for Santa to bring toys to all the kids in his class, including Nicole, and explains the sentimental value of his teddy bear. Remorseful, Nicole, alongside her best friend Lenee and Ricky's friend Smithy, attempt to find the bear to no avail. After looking through the basement of the local garbageman, Smithy suggests that the bear may be in the local dump. Upon arrival, the trio are ambushed by guard dogs and class bullies Todd, Tug, and Zeke. Smithy is able to attract the attention of the dogs by throwing his sandwich at Todd, resulting in the dogs attacking the bullies as they run away. Smithy finds the bear on top of a car and Nicole returns it to Ricky, who explains that it was a gift for her and that friendship, like the bear, means a lot to him.

In a subplot, after being made fun of by Nicole for still believing in Santa, Lenee begins to question her belief in Santa Claus, causing her to be depressed. Her father is able to restore her spirits, resulting in not only Lenee being able to continue believing in Santa, but also allowing Nicole to believe in Santa too, much to the pleasure of her parents. Nicole and Lenee's family, Ricky and Fran, and Smithy all spend Christmas at Lenee's house. Smithy and the others notice Santa with his sleigh and reindeer flying outside the house, and they all proclaim their belief in Santa, with Nicole's father telling her how proud he is of her. Ricky's great-grandmother adds that she never stopped believing in Santa, and the children don't have to either. Ricky tells his great-grandmother that she always knows just what to say, to which she responds with laughter- screaming gibberish and the word "Christmas," pronounced with a weird accent. The special ends with Nicole's father sharply instructing them to shut the front door.

Cast

 Walter Emanuel Jones as Ricky Rodgers
 Mark Hamill as Eric
 Paige O'Hara as Nicole
 Nancy Cartwright as Todd
 Jodi Benson as Lenee
 Grey DeLisle as Jenna
 Debra Wilson as Great Grandma Fran Rodgers
 Clint Howard as Tug
 Jack Angel as Robert
 April Winchell as Nana
 Eddie Driscoll as Smithy
 Sarina C. Grant as Ms. Parmington
 Robert Machray as Principal
 Sherry Weston as Peg
 Andi Matheny as Debbie
 J.R. Horsting as Zeke

Production
According to Kennedy Rose, daughter of Chris Rose, one of the special's executive producers, production started back in 2002, when her father and a friend of his formed J Rose Productions. Wolf Tracer Studios, a computer animation company also known for producing the 2004 direct-to-video feature Wolf Tracer's Dinosaur Island (also starring Hamill) and the full-length animated pilot Not Quite Right by Crappco, was hired to make the film's animation. Her father trusted the animators, to the point where he spent around $500,000 USD on production, and never checked in on their work. His first time seeing the animation was on the night the movie premiered on television. Rapsittie Street Kids: Believe in Santa was animated in 3D Choreographer with effects provided by Adobe Photoshop and Adobe After Effects.

A demo reel from Wolf Tracer features an early test animation of Rapsittie Street Kids under the name The Bash Street Kids, not to be confused with the British comic strip. The website of Promark Television, the special's distributor, enthusiastically promoted Believe in Santa as "an animated program ... that seems destined to become a classic".

Music
A soundtrack was released sometime in late 2002. It features five songs, most are vocally performed in the film.
 "Ricky's Rap" 
 "Christmas Chimes" 
 "Best Kid in the World" 
 "Believe in Santa" 
 "Through a Child's Eye"

Broadcast
As part of its syndicated distribution after its WB 100+ airing, it aired on KFVE-TV in Hawaii on December 7, 2002,
WABC-TV in New York and KABC-TV in Los Angeles on December 21, 2002, continuing to air through the United States in larger markets in syndication until Christmas Day (when then-CBS-owned WFRV-TV in Green Bay aired it), though its top-100 market distribution outside of the smaller-market WB 100+ chain cannot be fully ascertained. After the 2002 holiday season, the film eventually fell into obscurity. It was found in 2015 by Dycaite, the founder of the Lost Media Wiki, a website dedicated to documenting lost media, and uploaded to Vimeo.

In December 2020, an article on Polygon revealed an extensive insight into the making of Rapsittie Street Kids with interviews from members of the production team and Debra Wilson.

Reception and legacy
Rapsittie Street Kids: Believe in Santa has become infamous among fans of bad films. Ever since it aired on television, it received extremely negative reviews from critics and audiences, and has been repeatedly noted for its "hideous" and ugly computer animation and bizarre production history, though the ensemble voice cast received some praise.

Cancelled sequel
Believe in Santa was intended to be the first in a series of Rapsittie Street Kids specials. The end credits teases a follow-up tentatively titled A Bunny's Tale with Lenee's younger sister, Jenna, explaining "I'll be back for the Easter Bunny". It was planned for 2003, but was never produced, although two stations had it listed on their TV schedules.

References

External links
 

2002 television specials
Animated television specials
Musical television specials
Animated Christmas films
Christmas television specials
2000s American television specials
Rediscovered American films
Christmas television films